"Haddocks' Eyes" is the nickname of the name of a song sung by The White Knight from Lewis Carroll's  1871 novel Through the Looking-Glass, chapter VIII.

"Haddocks' Eyes" is an example used to elaborate on the symbolic status of the concept of "name": a name as identification marker may be assigned to anything, including another name, thus introducing different levels of symbolization. It has been discussed in several works on logic and philosophy.

Naming

The White Knight explains to Alice a confusing nomenclature for the song.

To summarize:

The song's name is called Haddocks' Eyes
The song's name is The Aged Aged Man
The song is called Ways and Means
The song is A-sitting on a Gate

The complicated terminology distinguishing between 'the song, what the song is called, the name of the song, and what the name of the song is called' both uses and mentions the use–mention distinction.

The song

The White Knight sings the song to a tune he claims as his own invention, but which Alice recognises as "I give thee all, I can no more". By the time Alice heard it, she was already tired of poetry.

The song parodies the plot, but not the style or metre, of "Resolution and Independence" by William Wordsworth.

Upon the Lonely Moor

Like "Jabberwocky," another poem published in Through the Looking Glass, "Haddocks’ Eyes" appears to have been revised over the course of many years. In 1856, Carroll published the following poem anonymously under the name Upon the Lonely Moor. It bears an obvious resemblance to "Haddocks' Eyes."

See also

Nonsense verse

References

British poems
1871 poems
Alice's Adventures in Wonderland
Nonsense poetry
Parodies of literature